Vagabond Luck is a 1919 American silent comedy drama film directed by Scott R. Dunlap and starring Albert Ray, Elinor Fair, Jack Rollens, John Cossar, and William Ryno. The film was released by Fox Film Corporation on November 16, 1919.

Plot

Cast
Albert Ray as Jimmie Driscoll
Elinor Fair as Joy Bell
Jack Rollens as Harry Bell
John Cossar as Jim Richardson
William Ryno as Tunk
George Millum as Jumbo
Al Fremont as Spike Bradley
Lloyd Bacon as Buck
Johnny Ries as Johnny

Preservation
The film is now considered lost.

References

External links

1919 comedy-drama films
1910s English-language films
1919 films
American silent feature films
American black-and-white films
Fox Film films
Lost American films
1919 lost films
Lost comedy-drama films
1910s American films
Silent American comedy-drama films